The women's giant slalom competition of the Nagano 1998 Olympics was held at Mount Yakebitai on 10 February.

It was the first time snowboarding was added as a sport at the Winter Olympic Games. The giant slalom was replaced by the parallel giant slalom event in 2002 in Salt Lake City.

Medalists

Results

DSQ - Disqualified; DNS - Did not start; DNF - Did not finish

References 

Women's giant slalom
1998 in women's sport
Women's events at the 1998 Winter Olympics